The 2018 Newcastle Knights season was the 31st in the club's history. Coached by Nathan Brown and co-captained by Jamie Buhrer and Mitchell Pearce, they competed in the NRL's 2018 Telstra Premiership, finishing the regular season in 11th place (out of 16).

Milestones
 Round 1: Herman Ese'ese made his debut for the club, after previously playing for the Brisbane Broncos.
 Round 1: Slade Griffin made his debut for the club, after previously playing for the Melbourne Storm and scored his 1st try for the club.
 Round 1: Aidan Guerra made his debut for the club, after previously playing for the Sydney Roosters.
 Round 1: Chris Heighington made his debut for the club, after previously playing for the Cronulla-Sutherland Sharks.
 Round 1: Jacob Lillyman made his debut for the club, after previously playing for the New Zealand Warriors.
 Round 1: Tautau Moga made his debut for the club, after previously playing for the Brisbane Broncos.
 Round 1: Mitchell Pearce made his debut for the club, after previously playing for the Sydney Roosters, captained his 1st game for the club and kicked his 1st field goal for the club.
 Round 1: Kalyn Ponga made his debut for the club, after previously playing for the North Queensland Cowboys, scored his 1st try for the club and kicked his 1st career goal.
 Round 1: Connor Watson made his debut for the club, after previously playing for the Sydney Roosters.
 Round 2: Aidan Guerra scored his 1st try for the club.
 Round 2: Tautau Moga scored his 1st try for the club.
 Round 2: Connor Watson scored his 1st try for the club.
 Round 4: Chris Heighington scored his 1st try for the club.
 Round 5: Danny Levi played his 50th career game.
 Round 5: Nathan Ross played his 50th career game.
 Round 7: Jamie Buhrer played his 150th career game.
 Round 7: Mitchell Pearce scored his 1st try for the club.
 Round 7: Daniel Saifiti played his 50th career game.
 Round 8: Aidan Guerra captained his 1st game for the club.
 Round 8: Ken Sio kicked his 1st goal for the club.
 Round 11: Herman Ese'ese scored his 1st try for the club.
 Round 13: Jack Cogger scored his 1st career try.
 Round 16: Connor Watson played his 50th career game.
 Round 18: Nick Meaney made his NRL debut for the club.
 Round 19: Mitchell Barnett played his 50th career game.
 Round 19: Nick Meaney scored his 1st career try.
 Round 21: Mitchell Barnett played his 50th game for the club.
 Round 21: Herman Ese'ese played his 50th career game.
 Round 21: JJ Felise made his debut for the club, after previously playing for the Wests Tigers.
 Round 21: Shaun Kenny-Dowall played his 250th career game.
 Round 22: Mitchell Pearce played his 250th career game.
 Round 22: Pasami Saulo made his NRL debut for the club.
 Round 25: Nick Meaney kicked his 1st career goal.
 Round 25: Tom Starling made his NRL debut for the club.

Squad

Transfers and Re-signings

Gains

Losses

Promoted juniors

Change of role

Re-signings

Player contract situations

Ladder

Jerseys and sponsors
In 2018, the Knights' jerseys were made by ISC and their major sponsor was nib Health Funds.

Fixtures

Preseason  trials

Regular season

Statistics

29 players used.

Source:

Representative honours

The following players appeared in a representative match in 2018.

Australian Schoolboys
Timanu Alexander (squad member)
Bradman Best
Harry Croker
Jock Madden
Starford To'a

Fiji
Junior Roqica

Junior Kiwis
Pasami Saulo (squad member)

New South Wales under-16s
Thomas Cant

New South Wales under-18s
Bradman Best
Phoenix Crossland
Brock Gardner (squad member)
Jock Madden
Jaron Purcell

New Zealand
Herman Ese'ese
Slade Griffin
Danny Levi (squad member)

Queensland
Kalyn Ponga

Queensland under-20s
Beau Fermor

Individual honours

Newcastle Knights awards

Player of the Year
 National Rugby League (NRL) Player of the Year: Kalyn Ponga
 Intrust Super Premiership NSW Player of the Year: Luke Yates
 Jersey Flegg Cup Player of the Year: Beau Fermor

Players' Player
 National Rugby League (NRL) Players' Player: Kalyn Ponga
 Intrust Super Premiership NSW Players' Player: Luke Yates
 Jersey Flegg Cup Players' Player: Mat Croker

Coach's Award
 National Rugby League (NRL) Coach's Award: Aidan Guerra
 Intrust Super Premiership NSW Coach's Award: Zac Hosking
 Jersey Flegg Cup Coach's Award: Kurtis Dark

References

Newcastle Knights seasons
Newcastle Knights season